Jean-Clement Martin, born on 31 January 1948, is a French historian, a specialist in the French Revolution, Counter-revolution and the War in the Vendée.

Biography 
Jean-Clement Martin was a pupil of Emmanuel Le Roy Ladurie. From 2000 to 2008 he was the director of the Institute for the history of the French Revolution, a center of academic research and teaching, connected to Pantheon-Sorbonne University. Since then he is professor emeritus.

He studied the Vendée as a "memory space". For some years his research has focused on understanding violence, the contribution of gender history and the role of religion and religiosity in the revolutionary process.

He is opposed to considering the operations ordered in Vendée by the convention (whether the infernal columns, or the drownings of Nantes) as genocide. In his opinion, "there were war crimes and abominable battles, it is clear, but in no case a genocide".

In 2016, he categorically denies (calling it "sacrificial"), the interpretation of the Marseillaise that "qu'un sang impur abreuve nos sillons!" (Let an impure blood water our furrows!) means in truth that the Fédérés of 1792 were proud to pour their own blood for their homeland.

Works 
 Vendée-Chouannerie, Nantes, Éditions Reflets du passé, 1981 .
 Blancs et Bleus dans la Vendée déchirée, coll. « Découvertes Gallimard, 1986 .
 La Vendée et la France, 1789-1799, Éditions du Seuil, 1987 .
 La Vendée de la Mémoire, 1800-1980, Éditions du Seuil, 1989 .
 La Loire-Atlantique dans la tourmente révolutionnaire, Éditions Reflets du Passé, 1989.
 Le Massacre des Lucs, Vendée 1794 (en collaboration avec Xavier Lardière), Geste Éditions, La Crèche, 1992.
 Une région nommée Vendée, entre politique et mémoire, Éditions Geste, 1996 .
 La Révolution française, étapes, bilans et conséquences, Éditions du Seuil, collection Mémo, 1996 .
 La Vendée en 30 questions, Geste Éditions, La Crèche, 1996.
 Contre-Révolution, Révolution et Nation en France, 1789-1799, Éditions du Seuil, 1998 .
 Le Puy du Fou en Vendée, l'Histoire mise en scène (en collaboration avec Charles Suaud), L'Harmattan, 2000 .
 La Guerre de Vendée, Éditions Geste, 2001 .
 La contre-révolution en Europe siècles. Réalités politiques et sociales, résonances culturelles et idéologiques (ouvrage collectif), Presses universitaires de Rennes, 2001 .
 La Révolution française, 1789-1799, Éditions Belin, 2003 
 Violence et Révolution. Essai sur la naissance d'un mythe national, Éditions du Seuil, 2006 . Lire une recension de ce titre.
 Loire-Atlantique. Balades aériennes (en collaboration avec Michel Bernard), Patrimoines Medias, 2006 .
 Comtesse de Bohm, prisonnière sous la terreur. Les prisons parisiennes en 1793, Éditions Cosmopole, 2006 .
 La Vendée et la Révolution. Accepter la mémoire pour écrire l'histoire, Perrin, collection Tempus, 2007 . Lire une recension de ce titre.
 La Révolution française, Éditions Le Cavalier bleu, collection Idées reçues, 2008 .
 La révolte brisée, femmes et hommes dans la Révolution française et l'Empire (1770-1820), Armand Colin, 2008 .
 La Terreur. Part maudite de la Révolution, Gallimard, coll. « Découvertes Gallimard, 2010 .
 Marie-Antoinette, coauteur Cécile Berly, Citadelles-Mazenod, 2010, .
 La machine à fantasmes. Relire l'histoire de la Révolution française, Vendémiaire, .
 Édition critique de Peut-on prouver l'existence de Napoléon ?, de Richard Whately, Vendémiaire*, 2012.
 Nouvelle Histoire de la Révolution française, Perrin, 2012. 
 Un détail inutile ? Le dossier des peaux tannées. Vendée, 1794, Vendémiaire, 2013, .
 La Guerre de Vendée, 1793-1800, Points-Seuil, 2014 .
 La Machine à fantasme, Relire l'histoire de la Révolution française, Vendémiaire, Rééd. poche, augmentée, 2014.
 with Laurent Turcot Au cœur de la Révolution, les leçons d'histoire d'un jeu vidéo, Paris, Vendémiaire, 2015. .
 Robespierre, la fabrication d'un monstre, Perrin, 2016, 368 pages.
 La Terreur. Vérités et légendes, Perrin, 2017, 238 pages.
 Les Echos de la Terreur. Vérités d'un mensonge d'Etat, 1794-2018, Belin, 2018, 316 p., 9782410002065
Camisards et Vendéens. Deux guerres françaises, deux mémoires vivantes, with Philippe Joutard, Nîmes, Alcide éditions, 2018, 144 p.

References

1948 births
20th-century French historians
Living people
21st-century French historians